The 13th Guards Poltava Order of Lenin Twice Red Banner Orders of Suvorov and Kutuzov Rifle Division was an infantry division of the Red Army that was highly decorated during World War II.

Formed in January 1942 from the 87th Rifle Division (Second Formation) in January 1942, the division suffered heavy losses in the Second Battle of Kharkov and the subsequent Soviet retreat. Rebuilt, the division entered the Battle of Stalingrad in mid-September, in which it distinguished itself during several months of urban combat in the city center and at Mamayev Kurgan. After the end of the battle in early February, the division was withdrawn for rebuilding and in July 1943 joined the 5th Guards Army with which it spent the rest of the war. The division fought in the Battle of Kursk and the subsequent Soviet advance into Ukraine, capturing Dresden in the last days of the war. 

After the end of the war, the division was reorganized as the 13th Guards Mechanised Division. It became part of the Soviet occupation forces in Austria during the Cold War and served there until the Soviet withdrawal from the country in 1955. The division was disbanded and merged into the 39th Mechanised Division, which was redesignated as the 39th Guards Mechanized Division to perpetuate the traditions of the 13th Guards. The division fought in the suppression of the Hungarian Revolution of 1956 and was stationed in Hungary for the rest of the Cold War. It was converted into the 21st Guards Tank Division in 1957 and returned to its wartime number as the 13th Guards Tank Division in 1965. As the Cold War drew to a close, the division was withdrawn to Crimea in 1989 and disbanded there under Soviet military reductions.

World War II
On 6 November 1941, the 87th Rifle Division (Second Formation) was re-formed and placed under the command of former commander of 5th Airborne Brigade Alexander Rodimtsev. On 19 January 1942, the 87th Rifle Division was officially awarded Guards status and was re-designated as the 13th Guards Rifle Division.

Battle of Kharkov
In May 1942, the 13th Division was involved in the Soviet counter-offensive at Kharkov, where they fought on its northern axis, thus escaping the encirclement and destruction of a substantial portion of the Soviet forces engaged, followed by the Russian defeat. During this offensive, the division suffered more than fifty-percent casualties, most of which were sustained in the repelling of fierce German counter-attacks. It was during one of these attacks that an Artillery Captain of the 13th earned the first Order of the Great Patriotic War 1st Class to be awarded. Following his unit's success during this offensive, Colonel Rodimtsev was subsequently promoted to Major General. The division was withdrawn from the front on 16 July to be rebuilt.

The Battle of Stalingrad

First blows
On 13 September of that year, German infantry divisions made their first advance into Stalingrad, marking the opening salvos of the Battle of Stalingrad. By the end of the day the German 71st Infantry Division had reached the city centre, north of the Tsaritsa Gorge. A Stavka directive ordered the 13th Guards Division (in the midst of its resupply and reinforcement) to the Volga River and Stalingrad. After being briefed by Lieutenant General Vasily Chuikov, the commander of the 62nd Army, Rodimtsev famously and determinedly declared:"I am a Communist! I have no intention of abandoning the city [Stalingrad]!"

Because of the recent influx of new recruits, the division was now largely inexperienced and untrained, and lacked both maps and knowledge of Stalingrad's rubble-strewn streets, which would prove enormously difficult to overcome in the struggle ahead. However, thanks to his experience fighting in the Spanish Civil War, Major General Rodimtsev was well versed in urban warfare. At 17.00, 14 September, the forward elements of the 13th Guards swiftly crossed the river to reinforce a line that was being held by a mere 15 tanks and few hastily assembled combat groups. It is estimated that more than half of the first wave perished during the river crossing, more than 3,000 being killed in just the first 24 hours. Ultimately, after extremely heavy losses on both sides, the German advance was repelled. Rodimtsev's soldiers recaptured the Mill and secured the central river crossing for other regiments of the 13th Guards.

The Railroad Station

The following morning one of Rodimtsev's junior officers, Lieutenant Anton Kuzmich Dragan was personally ordered by Chuikov to hold a key railroad station in downtown Stalingrad against an impending German assault. Dragan proceeded to gather a platoon of less than fifty men and moved them over to the railroad station. Here, the small but determined force prepared itself for the German attack.

Soon after digging in, a substantial force of German infantrymen arrived to seize control of the station. The Russians proceeded to repeatedly frustrate the Germans in an epic room-by-room struggle for control of the depot for nearly three weeks. Breaking through walls, crawling over rafters, and burrowing under the floorboards, the Russians would yield but a portion of the structure to the Germans, only to emerge elsewhere and start the struggle all over again.

Exchanging gunfire down hallways, hurling grenades back and forth between rooms, Dragan's men inflicted significant casualties on the Germans. In spite of this heroic resistance, Dragan's platoon was eventually reduced to a handful of men. After running out of ammunition, and with their rations gone, one of the Soviet Guardsmen took out his bayonet and carved on a wall,

Rodimtsev's Guardsmen fought and died for their country here.

Under cover of darkness, Dragan and the five remaining soldiers under his command eventually slipped out of the building, made their way through the German lines, and were reunited with the remainder of the division.

The Mamaev Kurgan 
The battle at the Mamaev Kurgan began approximately three weeks after the brutal fighting between the German and Russian infantrymen had begun in the outskirts of Stalingrad, on 15 September. During this portion of the battle, the division fought several Wehrmacht divisions for control of the park's central hilltop summit, which changed hands multiple times. Meanwhile, other divisional units fought in different sectors of Stalingrad. The division was in the midst of the combat throughout the city in the remains of the bombed-out buildings and factories, on the slopes of the Mamaev Kurgan hills, in the Red October Tractor Plant and in the key strategic building known as "Pavlov's House" (Yakov Pavlov was the commanding NCO of the platoon which defended the building). Most accounts state that of the 10,000 men of the division that crossed the Volga into the Battle of Stalingrad, only between 280 and 320 of them survived the struggle.

Battle of Kursk
Following the Soviet victory at Stalingrad and the destruction of the German 6th Army, the 13th Guards are again pulled from the lines for re-fit and re-supply. Alongside the 5th Guards Army (Voronezh Front), the division was held in reserve south of Kursk, in order to counter the forthcoming German offensive there – Operation Citadel. The original intention was for these two formations to counter-attack the Germans after the German assault had been ground down by the front line Soviet units, but both formations were committed to prevent a possible breakthrough. After several days of continuous fierce fighting (including the tank battle at Prokhorovka, in which the division's small number of armored units participated in), they successfully ground the elite Waffen-SS formations to a standstill. Meanwhile, the rifle battalions on the 13th held the line around Oboyan, repelling attacks from trenches. Relatively few casualties were sustained because the Germans were focusing their attention on Prokhorovka by the time they had moved up from the reserve area in the rear.

Liberation of Ukraine
Shortly thereafter, the 13th Guards Rifle Division advanced south-westwards, where they participated in the Red Army's assault to liberate Ukraine from German control. This is indicated by the designation of 13th Guards Rifle Division, Poltava (given in September 1943), which shows that the division was cited for their actions in seizing Poltava. After Poltava the division took part in the battle of the Dnieper. It was assigned to accomplish a false crossing of the Dnieper River to confuse the Germans and allow for crossings further north and south. Elements of the division crossed the river on floats and rafts to reach the island of Peschanny to the north-west of Kremenchuk where German infantry had occupied the west side of the island and had to be dislodged in hand-to-hand combat. The division forces sustained heavy losses in this operation when they were pinned down by enemy fire (even the deputy commander of the division Pavel Gayev was killed in action on the battlefield when commanding the operation).

After the Kremenchuk the division fought in the Kirovograd offensive, the Uman–Botoșani offensive, and the Lvov–Sandomierz offensive. For its capture of Novoukrainka and the key rail junction of Pomoshnaya during the Uman–Botoșani Offensive, the division was awarded the Order of Suvorov 2nd class on 29 March. It received a second Order of the Red Banner on 1 April 1944 for the capture of Pervomaysk. In July the division and the army fought in the Lvov–Sandomierz offensive as part of the 1st Ukrainian Front.

Advance into Germany
During the Red Army's final drive into Germany, the division was a part of the 32nd Guards Rifle Corps or was under direct command of the 5th Guards Army (2nd Ukrainian Front). This force drove the Germans back through northern Ukraine and central Poland in to the northern regions of Germany itself.

The division fought in the Vistula–Oder offensive, capturing Busko-Zdrój and Częstochowa, and crossing the German border on 19 January 1945. In February and early March 1945 the 13th Guards fought in the Upper Silesian offensive and the Lower Silesian offensive. During the Berlin Offensive, from 16 to 21 April, the division, as part of the army shock group, forced the Neisse and the Spree, advancing 60 km to cut the Dresden–Lübben autobahn northwest of Senftenberg. The 13th Guards reached Torgau on the Elbe on 23 April, its troops met with American units. For its "courage and valor" in the breakthrough of German defenses on the Neisse, the division was awarded the Order of Kutuzov 2nd class on 28 May. The division then turned southwards with the 5th Guards Army in the Prague offensive, in which it captured the strategic rail junction of Dresden on 8 May. During the war, over 20,000 soldiers of the division were decorated, and nineteen received the highest Soviet award, Hero of the Soviet Union.

Later service
The division became part of the Central Group of Forces after the war and by 1 November 1945 had been converted into the 13th Guards Mechanised Division. The division was stationed in Vienna until 1955, when the group was disbanded following the Soviet withdrawal from Austria. The division was disbanded and its personnel and equipment became part of the 39th Mechanised Division of the 38th Army in the Carpathian Military District on 9 September 1955. On 4 December, the 39th Mechanised was redesignated as a Guards unit and inherited the lineage of the 13th Guards. In 1956, during Operation Whirlwind, the Soviet invasion of Hungary, the 38th Army covered the Austrian and Yugolavian borders of Hungary on the right bank of the Danube. After the end of the invasion, the division became part of the Southern Group of Forces at Veszprém, where it remained for much of the Cold War. In December 1956, the 39th Guards became the 21st Guards Tank Division. In January 1965, the 21st Guards was renumbered as the 13th Guards Tank Division, restoring its World War II designation. According to American military sources corroborated by Vitaly Feskov and others, in September 1989, the division was transferred to Sovietske, Crimea in the Odessa Military District. It was disbanded there in December. The division's 130th Guards Tank Regiment, 56th Separate Reconnaissance Battalion, and 77th Separate Equipment Maintenance and Recovery Battalion became part of the 19th Guards Tank Division in Belarus.

The division's final honorifics in 1988 included 'Poltava', Order of Lenin, Twice Red Banner, Suvorov and Kutuzov.

Subordinate units during World War II
42nd Guards Rifle Regiment
39th Guards Rifle Regiment
34th Guards Rifle Regiment
32nd Guards Artillery Regiment
4th Guards Anti-Tank Battalion
8th Guards Sapper Battalion
14th Reconnaissance Company
139th Signal Battalion
12th Chemical Warfare Company
11th Transportation Company
17th Field Bakery
15th Medical Battalion
2nd Veterinary Hospital

References

Citations

Bibliography 

 Michael K. Jones. Stalingrad. How the Red Army triumphed.

Further reading
Keith E. Bonn (ed), Slaughterhouse: The Handbook of the Eastern Front, Aberjona Press, Bedford, PA, 2005, p. 361
CIA, History, 1953

G013
Military units and formations disestablished in 1989
1942 establishments in the Soviet Union
1989 disestablishments in the Soviet Union